The women's team recurve competition at the 2003 World Archery Championships took place in July 2003 in New York City, United States. 138 archers took part in the women's recurve qualification round with no more than 4 from each country, and the 16 teams of 3 archers with the highest cumulative totals (out of a possible 32) qualified for the 4-round knockout round, drawn according to their qualification round scores.

Seeds
Seedings were based on the combined total of the team members' qualification scores in the individual ranking rounds. The top 16 teams were assigned places in the draw depending on their overall ranking.

Draw

References

2003 World Archery Championships
World